Jinyoung Park (born 1982) is a South Korean mathematician at Stanford University working in combinatorics and graph theory. In 2022, she released a preprint containing a 6-page proposed proof of the Kahn–Kalai conjecture with Huy Tuan Pham.

Education and career
Park entered Seoul National University in 2001 and received her B.S. in Mathematics Education in 2004. She worked as a mathematics teacher in secondary schools in Seoul from 2005 to 2011. She began her graduate studies at Rutgers University in 2014, where she received her Ph.D. in 2020 under the supervision of Jeff Kahn. Her doctoral work earned the 2022 Dissertation Prize from the Association for Women in Mathematics.

She was a Member of the Institute for Advanced Study from 2020 to 2021. Since 2021, she has continued her postdoctoral work as a Szegö Assistant Professor at Stanford University, where her postdoctoral mentor is Jacob Fox.

Selected works
 Frankston, Keith; Kahn, Jeff; Narayanan, Bhargav; Park, Jinyoung "Thresholds versus fractional expectation-thresholds." Ann. of Math. (2) 194 (2021), no. 2, 475–495.

References

External links
 
 Profile at Stanford

Living people
21st-century South Korean mathematicians
South Korean women mathematicians
Combinatorialists
Rutgers University alumni
1982 births
Seoul National University alumni